Renat Vyacheslavovich Dubinskiy (born 6 May 1979) is a retired Kazakhstani professional footballer.

Club career
He made his professional debut in the Russian Third League in 1995 for FC Agidel Ufa. 

He made his Russian Premier League debut for FC Shinnik Yaroslavl on 16 March 2002 in a game against FC Alania Vladikavkaz and spent 4 seasons in the RPL with Shinnik. He played 1 game in the UEFA Intertoto Cup 2004 for Shinnik.

References

1979 births
People from Aktau
Living people
Kazakhstani footballers
Kazakhstan international footballers
Association football defenders
Russian Premier League players
Kazakhstan Premier League players
FC Neftyanik Ufa players
FC Baltika Kaliningrad players
FC Dynamo Stavropol players
FC Shinnik Yaroslavl players
FC Ural Yekaterinburg players
FC Aktobe players
Russian expatriate sportspeople in Kazakhstan
Expatriate footballers in Kazakhstan